WYRV is a Variety-formatted broadcast radio station licensed to Cedar Bluff, Virginia, serving Southwestern Virginia.  WYRV is owned and operated by Faith Communications, Inc.

References

External links

YRV
Variety radio stations in the United States
Radio stations established in 1985
YRV
1985 establishments in Virginia